The High Commissioner of the United Kingdom to Fiji is the United Kingdom's foremost diplomatic representative in the Republic of Fiji.

Fiji gained independence from the United Kingdom in 1970. As fellow members of the Commonwealth of Nations, the United Kingdom and Fiji conduct their diplomatic relations at governmental level, rather than between Heads of State. Therefore, the countries exchange High Commissioners, rather than ambassadors.

British High Commissioners to Fiji (or, from 1988 to 1997, British Ambassadors to Fiji) have also acted at various times as Ambassadors or High Commissioners to the Republic of Kiribati, the Republic of the Marshall Islands, the Federated States of Micronesia, the Republic of Nauru, the Kingdom of Tonga, Tuvalu and the Republic of Vanuatu.

List of heads of mission

High Commissioners to the Dominion of Fiji

1970–1974: John Robert Williams
1974–1978: James Stanley Arthur
1978–1982: John Morrison, 2nd Viscount Dunrossil, also to Nauru, Tuvalu
1982–1987: Roger Barltrop, also to Nauru, Tuvalu

Ambassadors Extraordinary and Plenipotentiary to the Sovereign Democratic Republic of Fiji

On 1 October 1987 Fiji was deemed to have left the Commonwealth and the British High Commission became the British Embassy.

1988–1989: Roger Barltrop, also High Commissioner to Nauru, Tuvalu
1989–1992: Peter Smart, also High Commissioner to Nauru, Tuvalu
1992–1995: Timothy David, also High Commissioner to Kiribati, Nauru, Tuvalu
1995–1997: Michael Peart, also High Commissioner to Kiribati, Nauru, Tuvalu

High Commissioners to the Republic of Fiji

On 1 October 1997 Fiji returned to its membership of the Commonwealth and the British Embassy once again became the British High Commission.

1997: Michael Peart, also to Kiribati, Nauru, Tuvalu
1997–2000: Michael Dibben, also to Kiribati, Nauru, Tuvalu
2000–2002: Michael Anthony Price, also to Kiribati, Nauru, Tuvalu
2002–2006: Charles Mochan, also to Kiribati, Nauru, Tuvalu
2006–2009: Roger Sykes, also to Kiribati, Nauru, Tonga, Tuvalu, Vanuatu
2009–2011: Malcolm McLachlan, also to Kiribati, Nauru, Tonga, Tuvalu, Vanuatu

2011–2012: Timothy Smart (acting), also to Kiribati, Nauru, Tonga, Tuvalu, Vanuatu 
2012–2013: Martin Fidler (acting), also to Kiribati, Nauru, Tonga, Tuvalu, Vanuatu
2013: Steven Chandler (acting), also to Kiribati, Nauru, Tonga, Tuvalu
2013–2016: Roderick Drummond, also to Kiribati, Micronesia, Marshall Islands, Tonga, Tuvalu
2016–2020:Melanie Hopkins, also to Kiribati, Micronesia, Marshall Islands, Tonga, Tuvalu

2020–2022: George Edgar, also to Kiribati, Micronesia, Marshall Islands, Tuvalu

2022–present: Brian Jones, also to Micronesia, Marshall Islands, Tuvalu

References

External links

UK and Fiji, gov.uk

Fiji
 
United Kingdom
Fiji
United Kingdom